John S. Baras is a Greek American electrical engineer. He is a Professor and Lockheed Martin Chair in Systems Engineering, University of Maryland, College Park.

He was included in the 2019 class of fellows of the American Mathematical Society "for contributions to the mathematical foundations and applications of systems theory, stochastic systems, stochastic control, network security and trust, mentoring and academic leadership".

He received a Diploma (1970) in Electrical and Mechanical Engineering from the National Technical University of Athens and an MS (1971) in and a PhD (1973) in Applied Mathematics from Harvard.

References 

Living people
American people of Greek descent
American electrical engineers

Fellows of the American Mathematical Society
Year of birth missing (living people)
National Technical University of Athens alumni
Harvard University alumni
University of Maryland, College Park faculty